Rosemary Bailey may refer to:

 Rosemary A. Bailey (born 1947), British statistician
 Rosemary Bailey (author) (born 1953), British writer